The Sting II is a 1983 American comedy film and a sequel to The Sting, again written by David S. Ward. It was directed by Jeremy Paul Kagan and stars an entirely original cast including Jackie Gleason, Mac Davis, Teri Garr, Karl Malden and Oliver Reed.

Plot
1940 The Great Depression is over. King of the con men Fargo Gondorff is released from prison and reassembles his cronies for another con, out to avenge the murder of his lifelong pal and fellow con artist Kid Colors who was kidnapped, beaten, and then shot.

Gondorff's young protege Jake Hooker attempts to pull a scam on wealthy "Countess Veronique," who instead pulls one on him and turns out to be a grifter herself named Veronica.

Coming up with a boxing con, Gondorff's goal is to sting both Lonnegan, the notorious banker and gangster who wants revenge from a previous con, and Gus Macalinski, a wealthy local racketeer. One or both of them is behind Kid Colors' death.

Hooker pretends to be a boxer who is about to throw a big fight. Macalinski is not only hoodwinked into losing hundreds of thousands of dollars, but he is also talked into changing his original wager by Lonnegan. While one gangster takes care of the other, Gondorff and Hooker head for the train station with a bag full of money, tickets out of town and a final twist from Veronica.

Cast
 Jackie Gleason as Fargo Gondorff
 Mac Davis as Jake Hooker
 Teri Garr as Veronica
 Karl Malden as Gus Macalinski
 Oliver Reed as Doyle Lonnegan
 Ron Rifkin as Eddie
 Jose Perez as Carlos
 Val Avery as O'Malley
 Michael Alldredge as "Big Ohio"
 John Hancock as "Doc"
 Larry Hankin as "Handicap"
 Bert Remsen as "Kid Colors"
 Tim Rossovich as "Typhoon" Taylor
 Harry James as Band Leader
 Woodrow Parfrey as Georgie
 Max Wright as Floor Manager
 Benny Baker as Pyle
 Frances Bergen as Lady Dorsett
 Larry Bishop as Gellecher, Lonnegan's Second Guard
 Danny Dayton as Ring Announcer
 Tony Giorgio as Rossovich, Macalinski's Man
 Carl Gottlieb as Maitre d'
 Bob Minor as Savitt

Production

Continuity
This film's continuity to the first movie is disputed:

 At the time of the film's release, Director Jeremy Paul Kagan claimed, "The Sting II is inspired by and is an expansion of the first Sting, rather than a continuation. The principal characters of Fargo Gondorff and Jake Hooker are based on two very famous real-life con men, and are totally different from the two characters in the original." Furthermore, the first names of the two lead characters have changed: Henry Gondorff has become Fargo Gondorff, and Johnny Hooker has become Jake Hooker.

 However, characters in this film make specific references to events in the first film (the entire plot is driven by Lonnegan's desire to avenge his losses to Gondorff and Hooker in the first film), which would indicate this film was meant to be a direct sequel.

Music
"Heliotrope Bouquet," by Scott Joplin and Louis Chauvin
"The Chrysanthemum," "A Breeze from Alabama," "Cleopha," "The Entertainer," "Bethena," by Scott Joplin

Reception

Critical reviews
The Sting II holds a 0% at Rotten Tomatoes.

Awards
The film was nominated for an Academy Award for the Best Musical Score composed by Lalo Schifrin.

Home media
The Sting II was released on DVD in 2004 by Universal. Blu-ray release by Kino Lorber in 2021.

References

External links

1983 films
1980s crime comedy films
American crime comedy films
American sequel films
Universal Pictures films
Films directed by Jeremy Kagan
Films scored by Lalo Schifrin
Films with screenplays by David S. Ward
Films about con artists
1983 comedy films
1980s English-language films
1980s American films